Basdorf is a village to the north of Berlin, in the German federal state of Brandenburg. Until 2003, when it merged into Wandlitz, it was an autonomous municipality.

Villages in Brandenburg
Former municipalities in Brandenburg